Leslie Wilson may refer to:
Leslie Wilson (cricketer) (1859–1944), played for Kent
Sir Leslie Wilson (politician) (1876–1955), British politician, Royal Marines officer, and colonial governor
Leslie Wilson (cyclist) (1926–2006), British cyclist
Leslie Blackett Wilson (born 1930), British computer scientist, chair of computing science at the University of Stirling
Leslie Wilson (author), author of novels and short stories
Leslie Alan Wilson (born 1941/42), Australian billionaire
Leslie Wilson-Westcott (born 1979), Canadian curler

See also
Les Wilson (disambiguation)